9142 Rhesus  is a larger Jupiter trojan from the Trojan camp, approximately  in diameter. It was discovered during the third Palomar–Leiden Trojan survey in 1977, and later named after King Rhesus from Greek mythology. The dark D-type asteroid has a rotation period of 7.3 hours.

Discovery 

Rhesus was discovered on 16 October 1977, by Dutch astronomer couple Ingrid and Cornelis van Houten at Leiden, on photographic plates taken by Dutch–American astronomer Tom Gehrels at the Palomar Observatory in California. The body's observation arc begins with its first observation, a precovery taken at Palomar in December 1954.

Palomar–Leiden survey 

The survey designation "T-3" stands for the third Palomar–Leiden Trojan survey, named after the fruitful collaboration of the Palomar and Leiden Observatory in the 1960s and 1970s. Gehrels used Palomar's Samuel Oschin telescope (also known as the 48-inch Schmidt Telescope), and shipped the photographic plates to Ingrid and Cornelis van Houten at Leiden Observatory where astrometry was carried out. The trio are credited with the discovery of several thousand asteroids.

Orbit and classification 

Rhesus is a dark Jovian asteroid in a 1:1 orbital resonance with Jupiter. It is located in the trailering Trojan camp at the Gas Giant's  Lagrangian point, 60° behind its orbit . It orbits the Sun at a distance of 4.5–5.8 AU once every 11 years and 9 months (4,295 days; semi-major axis of 5.17 AU). Its orbit has an eccentricity of 0.13 and an inclination of 13° with respect to the ecliptic.

Naming 

This minor planet was named from Greek mythology after King Rhesus of Thrace an ally of the Trojans against the Greeks in the Trojan War. He was killed in his sleep by Odysseus and Diomedes who attacked the Thracian camp in the dead of night. The official naming citation was published by the Minor Planet Center on 8 December 1998.

Physical characteristics 

In the SDSS-based taxonomy, Rhesus is a dark D-type asteroid, the most common type among the Jupiter trojans. It has also been classified as a D-type by Pan-STARRS' survey.

Rotation period 

In August 2012, and September 2013, two rotational lightcurves of Rhesus were obtained from photometric observations in the R-band by astronomers at the Palomar Transient Factory in California.

Diameter and albedo 

According to the survey carried out by the NEOWISE mission of NASA's Wide-field Infrared Survey Explorer, Rhesus measures 42.31 kilometers in diameter and its surface has an albedo of 0.062, while the Collaborative Asteroid Lightcurve Link assumes a standard albedo for a carbonaceous asteroid of 0.057 and calculates a shorter diameter of 34.85 kilometers based on an absolute magnitude of 11.02.

References

External links 
 Asteroid Lightcurve Database (LCDB), query form (info )
 Dictionary of Minor Planet Names, Google books
 Discovery Circumstances: Numbered Minor Planets (5001)-(10000) – Minor Planet Center
 
 

009142
Discoveries by Cornelis Johannes van Houten
Discoveries by Ingrid van Houten-Groeneveld
Discoveries by Tom Gehrels
5191
Named minor planets
19771016